Glades may refer to:
Glade (geography)
Glades County, Florida
Glades (Florida), a region of Florida
Everglades

In music
 Glades (band), an Australian indie band formed in 2015.

In sports
 Green Mountain Glades, a youth hockey team in Vermont

See also
The Glades (disambiguation)
Glade (disambiguation)